Negloides is a monotypic moth genus in the family Geometridae. Its only species, Negloides oceanitis, is known from Madagascar. Both the genus and species were described by Prout in 1931.

References

Geometridae
Moths of Madagascar
Monotypic moth genera